This is a List of dams of the Lower Colorado River Valley. There are many smaller dams, check dams, or diversion dams, that lace the length of the Colorado River.  The major Davis Dam directly downstream of Hoover Dam has the purpose of re-regulating Hoover Dam releases.

The purpose of this list is to accompany the List of lakes of the LCRV (birdwatching). The many lakes of the LCRV, the Lower Colorado River Valley, provide great opportunities for birdwatching, as well as a proximity to other riparian birdwatching habitats.

Major dams

Davis Dam
Parker Dam–The Colorado River Aqueduct exits W to Los Angeles.
Imperial Dam: the majority of the Colorado River exits as the All-American Canal, going to the Imperial Valley in the Calif. desert: Colorado Desert.
Laguna Diversion Dam
Morelos Dam

List of dams--North to South
Davis Dam
Parker Dam
Headgate Rock Dam//Headgate Dam (Moovalya Lake (Muuvaly in Mojave))- at Earp, Calif/Parker
Palo Verde Dam–(no lake)(Diversion Dam)- 4 mi N Ehrenberg/Blythe
Imperial Dam
Laguna Diversion Dam
Morelos Dam–(no lake)

References

External links
Davis Dam:https://web.archive.org/web/20090919010558/http://www.arizonaguide.com/whattodo/DisplayPark.aspx?id=AZDVSDM
Major Facilities on the Lower Colorado River:http://www.lcrmscp.gov/publications/Vol4/O.pdf
History of the Colorado River Indian Tribes:https://archive.today/20110513234423/http://www.postonalliance.org/generalHistory/crit.htm
History of the Colorado River:http://socoloriver.com/index.html

Dams of the Lower Colorado River Valley
lcrv